Teresa "Teresina" Brambilla (15 April 1845 – 1 July 1921) was an Italian soprano who sang in the major opera houses of Europe in a career spanning 25 years. She was particularly noted for her interpretations of the leading roles in operas by Amilcare Ponchielli whom she married in 1874.

Life and career 
Brambilla was born in Cassano d'Adda to a musical family. Her five aunts were all opera singers, three of whom (Marietta, Teresa, and Giuseppina Brambilla) had prominent careers. According to some accounts, she was trained in singing by Marietta and Teresa, and to others, by Giuseppina. She made her debut as Adalgisa in Norma in 1863 with the Italian opera company in Odessa where both Giuseppina and Teresa had sung to great success. 

In Italy she performed primarily in the theatres of Milan, Ancona, Turin, and Rome. On 5 December 1872 she sang the role of Lucia Mondella in the premiere of Amilcare Ponchielli's major revision of his early opera I promessi sposi. The performance inaugurated Milan's Teatro Dal Verme and proved to be Ponchielli's first major success and a breakthrough for him as an opera composer. Ponchielli and Brambilla married in 1874, and she became known as the "ideal interpreter" of his works, receiving particular acclaim for her performance in the title role of La Gioconda which she first sang at La Scala on 18 April 1876.

Brambilla sang in the Rome premieres of Lohengrin (as Elsa) and Poliuto (as Paolina) and was also known for her interpretations of the Verdi heroines, Leonora and Aida. In the carnival season of 1875, she had sung the title role in Aida to great success at the Teatro Carlo Felice in Genoa, conducted by Verdi himself, in a run of 30 consecutive performances. After Ponchielli's death in 1886, she continued to perform until 1889 when she retired from the stage and became a voice teacher at the Geneva Conservatory. She later returned to Italy where she taught at the Pesaro Conservatory until 1911. Brambilla died in Vercelli at the age of 76. She and Ponchielli had three children, two sons and a daughter. Their son Annibale was a music critic and minor composer.

Roles created 
Lucia Mondella in the revised version of Amilcare Ponchielli's I promessi sposi, Teatro Dal Verme, Milan, 5 December 1872
Luce in Stefano Gobatti's Luce, Teatro Comunale, Bologna, 26 November 1875
Lina in Amilcare Ponchielli's Lina, Teatro Dal Verme, Milan 17 November 1877
Flora in Filippo Marchetti's Don Giovanni d'Austria, Teatro Regio, Turin, 11 March 1880

In addition to the above opera roles created by Brambilla, she was also the principal soloist in the first performance of Ponchielli's cantata Omaggio a Donizetti ("Homage to Donizetti"). It was performed at the Teatro Riccardi in Bergamo on 13 September 1875, the day the ashes of Gaetano Donizetti and Simone Mayr were transferred to the city's Basilica of Santa Maria Maggiore.

Notes

References 

Italian operatic sopranos
1845 births
1921 deaths
People from Cassano d'Adda
19th-century Italian women opera singers
Voice teachers